Navy Blues is a 1937 American film directed by Ralph Staub.

Plot summary 

A sailor bets his friends he can date any woman he wants to. They pick out a librarian with a reputation as a "cold fish", and when he pursues her he discovers that he has competition—and his rival has much more sinister intentions than he does.

Cast 
Mary Brian as Doris Kimbell
Dick Purcell as Russell J. 'Rusty' Gibbs
Warren Hymer as Gerald 'Biff' Jones
Joe Sawyer as Chips
Edward Woods as Julian Everett
Horace McMahon as Gateleg
Chester Clute as Uncle Andrew Wayne
Lucile Gleason as Aunt Beulah Wayne
Ruth Fallows as Goldie
Alonzo Price as Dr. Crowley
Mel Ruick as Lawson
Carleton Young as Spencer, of Naval Intelligence

Soundtrack

External links 

1937 films
American black-and-white films
1937 comedy films
Military humor in film
Republic Pictures films
American comedy films
Films directed by Ralph Staub
1930s English-language films
1930s American films